The Albany Capitals joined the third incarnation of the American Soccer League in 1988. The team joined the American Professional Soccer League in 1990 when the ASL merged with the Western Soccer League. The club played in Albany, New York.

After the collapse of the NASL, the ASL took up the void. Several former NASL and International stars joined Albany including Chico Borja, Elvis Comrie and Hubert Birkenmeier (Cosmos), and England's World Cup star Paul Mariner (Ipswich, Arsenal).

Year-by-year

Ownership and staff
 Armand Quadrini – Owner
 Joe Hennessey – General Manager
 Charlie Curto – Technical Advisor

Former managers
 Paul Mariner
 John Bramley
Sports in Albany, New York
Defunct soccer clubs in New York (state)
Men's soccer clubs in New York (state)
American Soccer League (1988–89) teams
American Professional Soccer League teams
1988 establishments in New York (state)
1991 disestablishments in New York (state)
Association football clubs established in 1988
Association football clubs disestablished in 1991

References